Scripps College is private liberal arts women's college in Claremont, California. It was founded in 1926 as a member of the Claremont Colleges, and is widely regarded as the most prestigious women's college in the Western United States. Many notable individuals have been affiliated with the college as graduates, non-graduating attendees, faculty, staff, or administrators.

Scripps has graduated  classes of students. As of the   semester, the college enrolls approximately  students.

As of the   semester, Scripps employs  faculty members. The college has had nine official  presidents and several interim presidents, including the current interim president, Amy Marcus-Newhall.

Notable alumnae

Notable faculty

Presidents of Scripps College

See also
 List of Claremont Colleges people

Notes

References

External links
Scripps College alumnae website

Lists of people by university or college in California